Campanula poscharskyana, the Serbian bellflower or trailing bellflower, is a semi-evergreen trailing perennial, valued for its lavender-blue star-shaped flowers. It is native to the Dinaric Alps in former Yugoslavia.

Description
Flowers are lavender-blue and bloom from mid-spring to early autumn.

Cultivation and uses
This tough rockery plant bears sprays of violet starry flowers in spring and summer. Vigorous and fast growing, it is able to stand drying out once established in a wall. It will self-seed into cracks in walls and paving.

Although it is considered winter hardy, many growers bring it indoors and keep it in slightly moist soil on a windowsill, or in the basement under a lamp.

It is common to cut the plant down during the fall, so it can conserve energy during the winter, and then replant it in spring. In winter, no fertilizer is needed.

Plants can be grown from stem cuttings or division of the roots.

Numerous varieties and cultivars have been developed for garden use, including 'Blue Gown', 'Blue Waterfall', 'Freya', 'E.H. Frost', 'Glandore', 'Lisduggan Variety', 'Senior', and 'Silberregen'. The cultivar 'Stella' has gained the Royal Horticultural Society's Award of Garden Merit. 

The leaves are edible year round, and can be put in salads.

Pests
Thrips and aphids feed on the leaves.

References

 Translated from Swedish and Dutch Wikipedia.

poscharskyana
Flora of Croatia
Plants described in 1908